WFME-FM (92.7 FM, Family Radio) is a radio station licensed to Garden City, New York, and serving the western Long Island and New York City area. It is owned by Family Stations, Inc and broadcasts a religious music & reformed Christian teaching, Southern gospel music, and hymns format. The station's transmitter is located at the North Shore Towers in Glen Oaks, Queens.

History

In 1987, the station went on the air as WDRE-FM, and in 1996 changed to WLIR-FM. Univision purchased the station in January of, 2004 and simulcast "Latino Mix" WCAA 105.9 FM licensed to Newark, New Jersey (WCAA would later move to 96.3 FM as the result of a frequency swap with classical music station WQXR).

On Memorial Day 2005, both stations became "La Kalle," a reggaeton-formatted station. The station at 105.9 became WCAA and 92.7 became WZAA.

In late January 2007, Univision ended the simulcast and changed the call sign to WQBU-FM.

In March 2007, the station announced that they would become the Spanish-language home of the New York Yankees, with Beto Villa as the play-by-play announcer.

In 2010, the station became the Spanish language home of the New York Mets, with Juan Alicea and Max Perez Jimenez with the calls.

On November 15, 2012, WQBU-FM changed their format to Spanish Tropical, branded as "Mami 92.7".

On March 31, 2014, WQBU-FM switched to a news/talk format nationally syndicated by Univision America. This makes it the 10th station overall and the first FM station in Univision's portfolio to have the Univision America network.

On October 22, 2014, WQBU-FM changed their format to Regional Mexican, branded as "92.7 Nueva York".

In March 2016, WQBU-FM rebranded as "Que Buena 92.7".

On August 2, 2019, WQBU-FM changed their format from Regional Mexican to Spanish AC, due to 93.1 Amor having dropped the Spanish AC format in the spring of 2018 in favor of Bachata Music.

On November 9, 2020, WQBU-FM began adding Salsa romántica titles from artists such as Eddie Santiago, Gilberto Santa Rosa, Grupo Niche, Jerry Rivera, Willie Colón and Rey Ruiz.

On December 3, 2021, it was announced that the station had been purchased by Family Radio. Upon completing the sale on January 20, 2022, Family Radio announced that, in addition to relaunching the station with its religious programming, it would change the call sign to WFME-FM. The station change occurred at midnight on Friday, January 21, 2022 and 92.7 began broadcast of Family Radio East nationally syndicated programming consisting of Christian preaching from teachers such as John F. MacArthur & R. C. Sproul, and music from artists such as Keith & Kristyn Getty, and Fernando Ortega. The call sign change occurred on January 26, 2022.

References

External links
Family Radio Website

Mass media in Nassau County, New York
FME-FM
Family Radio stations
Radio stations established in 1988
1988 establishments in New York (state)